The 1986–87 season was Blackpool F.C.'s 79th season (76th consecutive) in the Football League. They competed in the 24-team Division Three, then the third tier of English league football, finishing ninth.

Paul Stewart was the club's top scorer, with 21 goals.

During the close season, on 26 July, the club celebrated their centenary.

Table

References

Further reading

Blackpool
1986-87